Sérgio Buarque de Holanda (July 11, 1902 – April 24, 1982) was a Brazilian historian, writer, journalist and sociologist. His greatest achievement was Raízes do Brasil, a landmark of Brazilian sociology, in which he developed the groundbreaking concept of the "cordial man" as the fundamental Brazilian identity. 
His son, Chico Buarque de Holanda is an accomplished singer-songwriter and novelist and his daughter Miúcha was also a famous singer. Buarque de Holanda was also a member of the Academia Paulista de Letras.

Life and career

Sérgio Buarque de Holanda was born on July 11, 1902, in São Paulo. At the age of nineteen, he moved with his family to Rio de Janeiro. In the following year, he participated in the Week of Modern Art, returning to São Paulo for the event, later being nominated by Mário de Andrade and Oswaldo de Andrade the representative of the Klaxon magazine in Rio de Janeiro.

In 1925, he earned the degree of bachelor of law from the Universidade do Brasil, today renamed as Universidade Federal do Rio de Janeiro. In 1926, he moved to Cachoeiro do Itapemirim, in Espírito Santo, after being invited by the director of the newspaper O Progresso.

He returned to Rio de Janeiro in 1927 and started to work as a columnist of the Jornal do Brasil and as an employee of the United Press Agency. Four years later, he traveled to Europe as a correspondent of the Diários Associados and settled in Berlin, where he met Friedrich Meinecke.

He collaborated, in 1930, in the "Brasilianische Rundschau" magazine of the Conselho do Comércio Brasileiro de Hamburgo. In 1936, back in Brazil, he worked at the Universidade do Distrito Federal as assistant-teacher to Henri Hauser in the chair of contemporary and modern history. He also taught comparative literature as an assistant to Professor Trouchon.

In 1936, Buarque de Holanda published his book Raízes do Brasil, considered by many to be one of the most important books ever written in Brazil.

Invited by the State Departament sector of International Relations, he traveled in 1941 to the United States.

Three years later, he became the director of the Divisão de Consulta da Biblioteca Nacional do Rio de Janeiro. In 1945, he participated of the Democratic Left foundation, and traveled to São Paulo to participate in the Writers' Congress. He was elected as a president of the Federal District Sector of the Brazilian Association of Writers.

He traveled to Paris for three academic conferences at the Sorbonne, in 1949 and, in 1952, Buarque de Holanda moved with his family to Italy, where he stayed for two years as visiting professor in the Brazilian Studies Department of University of Rome.

In 1957, he received the Edgard Cavalheiro Prize from the Instituto Nacional do Livro after publishing the book "Caminhos e Fronteiras". He occupied in 1958, the chair of History of the Brazilian Civilization in the Faculdade de Filosofia, Letras e Ciências Humanas of University of São Paulo (USP), with the thesis Visão do Paraíso – os motivos edênicos no descobrimento e na colonização do Brasil.

He became in 1962 the first director of the Instituto de Estudos Brasileiros of University of São Paulo. From 1963 to 1967, he traveled as visiting professor to universities in Chile and the United States and participated in cultural missions in association with Unesco in Peru and Costa Rica.

In 1969, he retired from his job as professor of USP in solidarity with his colleagues affected by the AI-5 (see Brazilian military dictatorship and military dictatorship). He also received the Governador do Estado Prize, in 1967, in the category of literature.

In 1979, he received, as the year's Brazilian Intellectual, the Juca Pato Prize. In the following year, Buarque de Holanda participated in the foundation of the Workers' Party receiving the third membership card of the party.

Sérgio Buarque de Holanda died in São Paulo, on April 24, 1982, from pulmonary complications.

Partial bibliography 
(By year of first ed.)
 Raízes do Brasil. Rio de Janeiro, 1936.
 Cobra de Vidro. São Paulo, 1944.
 Monções. Rio de Janeiro, 1945.
 Expansão Paulista em Fins do Século XVI e Princípio do Século XVII. São Paulo, 1948.
 Caminhos e Fronteiras. Rio de Janeiro, 1957.
 Visão do Paraíso. Os motivos edênicos no descobrimento e colonização do Brasil. São Paulo, 1959.
 Do Império à República. São Paulo, 1972. (História Geral da Civilização Brasileira, Tomo II, vol. 5).
 Tentativas de Mitologia. São Paulo, 1979.
 Sergio Buarque de Hollanda: História (org. Maria Odila Dias). São Paulo, 1985.
 O Extremo Oeste . São Paulo, 1986.
 O espírito e a letra (org. Antonio Arnoni do Prado) 2 vols. São Paulo, 1996.
 Para uma nova história (org. Marcos Costa). São Paulo, 2004 (collection of texts).

See also 
 Jeitinho

Notes 

1902 births
1982 deaths
20th-century Brazilian historians
Brazilian journalists
Federal University of Rio de Janeiro alumni
Workers' Party (Brazil) politicians
Writers from São Paulo
Academic staff of the University of São Paulo
20th-century Brazilian male writers
20th-century journalists